Sanguma was a Papua New Guinean musical ensemble active from 1977 to 1985. They combined music from the cultural tradition of Papua New Guinea with Western instruments and were one of the first Papua New Guinean music groups to perform internationally. Sanguma formed at the National Arts School in 1977 and performed in their homeland at the South Pacific Festival of Arts in 1980. Sanguma were nurtured very closely in their early days by the Australian musician Ric Halstead, who was a lecturer at the National Arts School in Port Moresby from whence Sanguma originated and Les McLaren.

Sanguma produced six albums in cassette format; the two eponymously titled Sanguma 1 and Sanguma 2 in the late 1970s also Sanguma Live vol 1 and 2 and ‘Eberia’ with the National Dance Company and in 1983, 'Sanguma Suites', an adventurous excursion into progressive/traditional/rock/jazz/fusion composed by band members Tony Subam (East Sepik Province) and Sebastian Miyoni (Milne Bay Province) and ostensibly by these two musicians rather than the band Sanguma, but as the band featured heavily on the album it was in all but name a Sanguma album.
The first two albums were somewhat better received than was Sanguma Suites as they were closer to the traditional music of Papua New Guinea. All the albums utilised modern amplified instrumentation to supplement the traditional flutes, drums and vocal sequences. In 1979 Sanguma toured PNG performing in Lae, Goroka, Madang, Wewak, Manus and Alotau. In 1980 they performed at the opening of the P.N.G High Commission in Canberra, Australia as well as performing in Kings Cross in Sydney and the Bondi Hotel. Sanguma also performed in Düsseldorf in Germany and whilst on route took time out to climb the Eiffel Tower in Paris. Sanguma also performed in Japan, These ventures were under the guidance of Ric Halstead who was their mentor from 1979 to 1982. Sanguma supported UK reggae band Steel Pulse on a tour of the US West Coast in 1983, receiving favourable reviews and attracting interest in Papua New Guinea's traditions and indirectly promoting the nascent tourist industry.

Hearing the Future: The Music and Magic of the Sanguma Band, by Denis Crowdy, was published in January 2016 by University of Hawai'i Press in their series on Music and Performing Arts of Asia and the Pacific.  A brief description of the book is as follows:

"During the turbulent decades of the 1970s and 1980s, Papua New Guinea gained political independence from a colonial hold that had lasted almost a century. It was an exciting time for a diverse group of pioneering musicians who formed a band they named "Sanguma." These Melanesian artists heard an imagined future and performed it during a socially and politically critical time for the region. They were united under one goal: to create a sound that represented the birth of a new, sovereign, and distinctly Melanesian nation; and to express their values, identities, and cosmology through their music and performance. Sanguma's experimental music sounded the complex expectations and pressures of their modern nation and helped to steer its postcolonial journey through music.

In Hearing the Future, Australian ethnomusicologist Denis Crowdy documents and analyzes the music and activities of the Sanguma band, arguing that their music was a vital form of cultural expression in sync with sociopolitical change then taking place in PNG. Drawing from rock, jazz, and nascent "world music" influences, Sanguma reached audiences far from their home nation, introducing the world to modern music, Melanesia-style, with its fusion of old and new, local and global. Performances ranged from ensembles of Melanesian log drums (garamuts) to extended songs and improvisations involving electric guitars, synthesizers, saxophone, trumpet, bamboo percussion, panpipes, and kuakumba flutes. The band sang in a variety of local vernacular languages, as well as in Tok Pisin and English. To further emphasize their ancestral style, the musicians wore decorative headdresses and body decoration from all around the nation, along with distinctive pants featuring indigenous designs."

Members

External links
Article about Buruka Tau from the Papua New Guinea Post Courier
Papua New Guinea Music History
http://www.uhpress.hawaii.edu/p-9540-9780824851569.aspx 2016 "Hearing the Future: The Music and Magic of the Sanguma Band," Author: Crowdy, Denis; 
https://www.youtube.com/watch?v=rYtbPE1Y5Do This live radio interview with the members of Sanguma Band was recorded from a National Broadcasting Corporation of Papua New Guinea Radio Program "University on Air" on Friday 18 November 1977 by Ian Ross.  This was a promotion for the Band member's final UPNG graduation concert the following Friday 25 November 1977.

World music groups
Papua New Guinean music